The Garden Shop Addition is a historic Craftsman commercial building in downtown Carmel-by-the-Sea, California. The kiosk was designed and built in 1931, by master builder Hugh W. Comstock, and is adjacent to The Tuck Box and the Lemos Building. The shop was designated as a significant commercial building in the city's Downtown Historic District Property Survey, and was recorded with the Department of Parks and Recreation on October 8, 2002. The building is occupied by Exclusive Realty.

History

The Garden Shop Addition is a one-story, polygonal shaped shop that shares a courtyard with the Tuck Box and the Lemos Building. It is connected on the south side to the El Paseo Building. It is a Craftsman style commercial building with a shingle roof with a candy-stripe awning. Carmel stone was used around the bay window, which extends into the arched stone gate that leads into the courtyard. The building has multi-pane windows at four sides of the polygonal walls, with a Dutch door that leads inside. The shingles and stone tie the design into the rest of buildings in the courtyard.

Pedro J. Lemos (1882-1954), director of Stanford Museum and Art Galleries, bought the Art Shop (later called Tuck Box) and adjacent property from Ray C. De Yoe in 1927. Lemos's vision of the space was to fill it with unique shops and studios reminiscent of medieval shops in the "old world cities."

In April 1929, Lemos designed a fairy-tale cottage for himself, based on Hugh W. Comstock's Tuck Box design, in the rear of the property, that Louis Anderson built for $1,000. It was called the Lemos Building, or Garden Shop. The shop sold flowers, plants, and garden tools.

In November 1931, Lemos built a separate kiosk like addition to the Garden Shop that was constructed by Hugh Comstock for $475. It is known as the Garden Shop Addition and is between the Tuck Box and the El Paseo Building on Dolores Street. When it first opened it sold cut flowers, gift plants, and pottery.

In 1932, the Tuck Box was the Tyler Book Shop that sold new and old books, some of which were displayed in the three-sided bay window. To the right of the shop was the Blue Bird Tea Garden, and the Garden Shop Addition had a sign that said "The Garden Shop Flowers Plants Pottery."

The Garden Shop Addition qualifies for inclusion in the Downtown Historic District Property Survey as work doen by Hugh W. Comstock who established the Fairy-Tale Storybook Craftsman tradition in Carmel in the 1920s. The Garden Shop Addition is a fair example of this style, with the three-sided bay window, Carmel stone, and shingled roof. It blends in with the other buildings, within the stone gate and walled couryard. These buildings are internationally associated with the city of Carme-by-the-Sea.

See also
 The Tuck Box
 Lemos Building

References

External links

 Downtown Conservation District Historic Property Survey

1931 establishments in California
Carmel-by-the-Sea, California
Buildings and structures in Monterey County, California